Casper Meets Wendy is a 1998 American fantasy comedy film based on the Harvey Comics cartoon characters Casper the Friendly Ghost and Wendy the Good Little Witch. The film is a sequel to Casper: A Spirited Beginning, and is the second spin-off/prequel of Casper. Saban Entertainment, co-produced the project. The film also marks the second Casper film to co-star Cathy Moriarty, who played the villainess in the 1995 film.

This was the first major film for Hilary Duff, who was 10 years old when the film was released on September 22, 1998, six days before her 11th birthday. The film itself was met with mostly negative reviews from critics, but was considered an improvement to its predecessor. Its television premiere was October 24, 1999 on Fox Family.

Plot
A mysterious object floats over a baseball game eventually revealing Stretch, Stinkie, and Fatso, the Ghostly Trio, who cause panic in the ballpark. Their nephew Casper attempts to settle the terrified crowd, but they are just as scared of him. The park empties, and after watching their effect with satisfaction, Casper's uncles plan a vacation.

Meanwhile, a malevolent warlock named Desmond Spellman believes himself to be the greatest warlock to have existed until he receives an unwelcome message from the Oracle in the Mirror, who tells him that in the future, none other than Wendy the Good Little Witch will surpass him. To avoid this, Desmond plans to get rid of her once and for all with the advised "Mystic Abyss", a dimensional rift that can destroy living beings. He then creates a pair of spies: Jules and Vincent, and assigns them to bring Wendy to him where she is living in the country with her three mischievous aunts: Gert, Gabby, and Fanny.

Jules and Vincent arrive at Wendy's house to escort the young witch to Desmond, but she narrowly escapes with her aunts. To keep Wendy safe from Desmond, her aunts hide and vacation at a resort hotel which happens to be the same place in which Casper and his uncles are vacationing. Casper and Wendy meet in a barn and become great friends. Unfortunately, they fear that their guardians will not get along because ghosts and witches are natural enemies. In order to make the guardians get along, Casper and Wendy devise a plan to make them meet at a party. Casper gets the Ghostly Trio to possess three men who happen to resemble them. Wendy convinces her aunts to go to the party to meet men. Thanks to their plotting, they meet and soon the Trio are flirting with the three witches, who are posing as regular women.

Though everything goes well at first, the plan is spoiled when the possession wears off and the Trio's real selves are revealed to Wendy's aunts, who, in turn, reveal their real selves and threaten them with magic. However, as Wendy explains to Casper, she and her aunts cannot use any high-level magic or else Desmond will be able to track them down. She begs Casper not to tell anyone about this, but when the Trio suspects that Casper is protecting the witches, they pressure him into blurting out that the witches cannot use their powers, prompting the Trio to terrorize Wendy and her aunts. Wendy feels she has no choice but to cast a high-level spell to cover the Trio in plaster, thus alerting Desmond of her location.

Distraught that Casper broke his promise, Wendy ends their friendship. Casper soon confronts his uncles and tells them that Desmond is coming after the witches and they should help, at which the Trio scoff and refuse. Before the witches can evacuate the resort, Desmond and his spies arrive. After finding and confronting the witches, Desmond explains the Oracle's prediction, and after she tries to resist him, summons the Mystic Abyss and casts Wendy into it, with Casper diving inside in an attempt to rescue her. Wendy's aunts battle Desmond but are no match for him. Before Desmond can turn the witches into fertilizer, a giant three-eyed monster appears and frightens the warlock who trips over Wendy's broom and falls into the Abyss himself. The monster turns out to be the Ghostly Trio, who had a change of heart. While they hold the door to the Abyss open, Wendy's aunts pull her and Casper out.

Both Casper and Wendy are unconscious from being inside the Abyss; but with encouragement and comfort from their guardians, Casper is restored by his uncles, and Wendy is treated by her aunts. After a touching reunion between the witches and an awkward one between the ghosts, the witches thank the Trio for helping them. The Oracle then proclaims that Wendy is the greatest witch because she did something no other witch ever could; she befriended a ghost. Later, Casper, his uncles, Wendy, and her aunts, all bid each other goodbye. Before flying back home with her aunts, Wendy gives Casper a goodbye kiss, causing him to blush.

Cast

Main

Live-action
 Hilary Duff as Wendy the Good Little Witch
 Cathy Moriarty as Gert
 Shelley Duvall as Gabby
 Teri Garr as Fanny
 George Hamilton as Desmond Spellman
 Richard Moll as Jules
 Vincent Schiavelli as Vincent
 Pauly Shore as The Oracle
 Blake Foster as Josh Jackman
 Logan Robbins as Logan
 Michael McDonald as Spike-Stretch
 Travis McKenna as Phil-Fatso
 Patrick Richwood as Vinne-Stinkie

Voice
 Jeremy Foley as Casper the Friendly Ghost
 Jim Ward as Stretch
 Bill Farmer as Stinkie
 Jess Harnell as Fatso

Supporting
 Rodger Halston as Larry Tullby
 Alan Thicke as Baseball Announcer
 Casper Van Dien as Crewcut Hunk
 Billy Burnette as Chef
 Maria Ford as Playmate (Fanny)
 Jim Jackman as Jerry Jackman
 Sheila Travis as Jean Jackman
 Clay Crosby as Honeycakes
 Tamie Lea Logan as Squeekums (Credited as Tami Logan)
 Ramsey Krull as Newsboy
 Paul Di Franco as Spectator (Credited as Paul di Franco)
 Howie Gold as Agitated Fan
 Charles Moore as Amazed Fan
 Emily Jennifer Grunfeld as Pretty Fan
 Manny Fernandez as Handsome Fan
 Michael Spagnoli as Panicked Fan
 Jim Wise as Hungry Fan
 Ricky Luna as Catcher
 John Rizzi as Cubana Boy
 Sebastian Hitzig as Desk Clerk
 Patricia Elliott as Snotty Woman (Credited as Pat Elliot)
 Sue Ellen Enright as Maid
 Cecile Krevoy as Snooty Lady
 Rodman Flender as Agile Dancer
 Michelle Marie as Rockin' Dancer
 Lisa Salazar as Smart Dancer
 Elizabeth Gage as Swift Dancer
 Karen Welch as Spinning Dancer
 Rick Dean as Table Occupant
 Lacey Taylor Robbins as Kim
 Larry Robbins as Boogie-Lovin' Dude
 Ben Stein as Lawyer (Uncredited)

Critical reception
Casper Meets Wendy received mostly negative reviews from critics, with a total of 6 reviews from critics on the review aggregator Rotten Tomatoes, 17% gave the film a positive review, with an average score of 4.05/10, which gives the film a slight improvement over its predecessor, but still low compared to the 1995 theatrical film.

Soundtrack alteration
In the original airing and VHS release of the film, the Casper theme can be heard in the opening sequence performed by Shana Halligan. In the subsequent DVD releases the lyric is muted though the melody and sound effects remain intact. However, Halligan is still credited with performing the theme song.

Awards and nominations
Despite the film's negative reviews from critics, Casper Meets Wendy won the Children's Programming - Electronic Visual Effects award. Hilary Duff was nominated for a Young Artist Award.

See also

List of ghost films

References

External links
 

1998 films
1998 direct-to-video films
1990s fantasy comedy films
1990s ghost films
20th Century Fox direct-to-video films
20th Century Fox animated films
Saban Entertainment films
1990s adventure films
American children's fantasy films
American comedy horror films
American films with live action and animation
American fantasy comedy films
American ghost films
American direct-to-video films
American sequel films
Brookwell McNamara Entertainment films
Casper the Friendly Ghost films
Casper the Friendly Ghost
Direct-to-video comedy films
Direct-to-video fantasy films
1990s English-language films
American films about Halloween
Films directed by Sean McNamara
Films produced by Mike Elliott
Live-action films based on comics
Live-action films based on animated series
Films based on Harvey Comics
Films about spirit possession
Films about witchcraft
Films with screenplays by Jymn Magon
1998 comedy films
1998 fantasy films
1990s American films